Waehneroceras is an extinct genus of cephalopod belonging to the Ammonite subclass.

Distribution
Jurassic of Argentina, Austria, Canada, Hungary and the United Kingdom.

References

Jurassic ammonites
Ammonites of North America
Hettangian life
Schlotheimiidae
Ammonitida genera